Arapaima gigas, also known as pirarucu or simply arapaima, is a species of arapaima native to the basin of the Amazon River. Once believed to be the sole species in the genus, it is among the largest freshwater fish. The species is an obligate air-breather, so needs to come to the surface regularly to gulp air.

Taxonomy

Arapaima gigas was originally regarded as the only species in the genus Arapaima, but the subsequent identification of further species, together with the rarity of specimens and the loss of several type specimens, has led to some uncertainty regarding classification within the genus and the identity of described individuals.

Description
A. gigas has a streamlined body with dorsal and anal fins set well back towards the tail. While the body is mainly gray to gray-green, its Brazilian local name pirarucu derives from an indigenous word for "red fish", thought to refer to either the red flecks on the scales towards the tail, or the reddish-orange color of its meat. The fish have "flexible, armor-like scales" made up of "a hard, mineralized outer layer" and "a tough-but-flexible inner layer" that help protect it from attacks by piranhas.

Distribution
A. gigas is native to freshwater in the basin of the Amazon River; it is known to occur in Bolivia, Brazil, Guyana, and Peru. In Bolivia known as paiche, it is considered an invasive species, affecting local native species and the ecosystem. It was first found in 1976, and presumably introduced from Peru being washed out of a Peruvian fish farm by a flood. The species has been introduced to parts of East Asia, both for fishing purposes and accidentally. The fish are found in flooded forest areas where they reproduce during the wet season; they relocate to lakes after water levels drop.

A 13-million-old fossil of arapaima (or very similar species) has been found in Colombia, in the Villavieja Formation, which dates from the Miocene era.

Physiology 
Morphology changes occur as A. gigas undergoes the transition from water-breather to air-breather 8–9 days after hatch. During the transition to air-breathing, the structure of the gills changes, making them better adapted for ion absorption, but less able to undergo gas diffusion. Once developmental changes in the gills take place, the lamella is less recognizable. The adult gills are made up of smooth, column-shaped filaments, instead. The kidneys have an important role in nitrogenous waste excretion in this species and are enlarged in adult fish.

Ecology
A. gigas requires breathing surface air to supplement the oxygen it derives from the use of its gills, and as such, is dependent on surfacing every 5–15 minutes to loudly gulp air at the surface. As in other species in the genus, a modified swim bladder that contains lung-like tissue is used for this purpose.

The species primarily feeds on fish, although juveniles prefer insects and fish larvae until fully grown. They also consume birds, mammals, fruits, and seeds on the water surface.

Spawning occurs in lakes and river channels during the time of low water levels (August to March). After the young hatch from eggs laid in a nest constructed by both parents, the male remains to protect them for a period of about three months. The young reach sexual maturity at an age of four to five years; average lifespan in captivity is 15–20 years.

Conservation
The species has in the past been heavily impacted by overfishing, exacerbated by their easily exploited habit of surfacing regularly for air-gulping. The IUCN is currently not assigning a conservation status to A. gigas due to a lack of detailed information about population developments. Arapaima fishing was banned outright in Brazil from 1996 to 1999, due to declining populations; since then, both subsistence and commercial fishing have been permitted in specially designated areas, and a sophisticated sustainable management strategy has led to massive recovery of stocks, from 2,500 in 1999 to over 170,000 in 2017.

For Bolivia, the paiche as an invasive species is considered a threat to local native species according to reports. Various reports show a correlation between the spreading of paiche and the decline in numbers of native fish species in parts of the Bolivian Amazon. Effects on local fish species populations and on fishing behaviors vary strongly by region. A joint study of the Bolivian government and different research organizations from 2017 points out the necessity to further evaluate the complex environmental and socioeconomic impact of paiche in the country.

References

Osteoglossidae
Taxa named by Heinrich Rudolf Schinz
Fish of the Amazon basin
Freshwater fish of South America
Fish described in 1822